Besançon Basket Comté Doubs was a basketball club based in Besançon, France that played in the Ligue Nationale de Basketball.  Their home arena was the Palais des sports Ghani-Yalouz. The club was placed into receivership and liquidated; it ceased to exist as of 1 September 2009.

It later re-launched in one of France's lower divisions. As of 2017, it plays in the country's NM2 league.

Basketball teams in France
Sport in Besançon